Childs Meadows is an unincorporated community in Tehama County, in the U.S. state of California.

History
The community was named after Frank Childs, a local rancher. A RV park and camping resort called "The Village at Childs Meadow" today occupies the site.

References

Unincorporated communities in Tehama County, California